A skill toy is an object or theatrical prop used for dexterity play or an object manipulation performance. A skill toy can be any static or inanimate object with which a person dances, manipulates, spins, tosses, or simply plays. Most skill toys are played alone, although some can be played with multiple people (such as footbag, juggling, and jump rope).

Examples

Common examples of skill toys include:

 Bamboo-copter
Balance board (Rola bola, Rocker, Rocker-roller, Wobble, Sphere-and-ring, Spring board, Above Water and Under Water balance boards))
Bilibo
Seesaw
Simply Fit Board
Teeterboard
 Neolttwigi
 Ball-in-a-maze puzzle
 Labyrinth (marble game)
 Perplexus
 Rubik's 360
 Balloon modelling (Balloon twisting)
 Baton
 Bicycle and related forms
 Balance bicycle
 Kickbike
 Jyrobike
 Quadracycle
 Tricycle
Big wheel
 Unicycle
 Bolas
Alaska yo-yo
 Astrojax
Clackers
Meteor
Monkey Knuckles
 Oxbow hammer (Puppy hammer)
Poi
 Begleri
 Blip (console)
 Bottle flipping
 Bouncing ball
 Ball (rhythmic gymnastics)
 Bouncy ball
 Skyball
 Bullroarer
 Buugeng
 Cage ball
 Cardistry
 Card manipulation
 Card throwing
 Cat's cradle
 Catch (game) and related variants:
 Playing catch with baseball and mitt
 (Velcro) Paddle catch and toss game
 Hot potato (game)
 Keep away
 Rundown (Pickle)
 Nerf ball
 Throwball
 Chakari (or Chakri or Vaḍā cakara or Big wheel)
 Chatter ring (Jitter ring)
 Claw crane
 Coin manipulation, Coin spinning, coin flipping, coin shooting/flicking/snapping and Poker chip tricks
Contact Juggling
 Baoding balls
 Cozy Coupe
 Cupong (Ping pong tricks)
 DapoStar
 Devil sticks
 Diabolo
 Dice stacking
 Drum sticks manipulation
 Etch A Sketch
Fanning
 Silk fan and Fan veil
 Fingerboard (skateboard)
 Flags
 Color guard (flag spinning) and Winter guard
 Flag throwing
Flagging
Pep flags
 Flip book
 Flip N Flyer
 Floating blow pipe ball
 Gee-haw whammy diddle
 Glowsticking
 Gravity racer
 Carrinhos de rolimã
 Soapbox cars
 Street luge
 Gunspinning, Fast Draw, Trick Shooting, and Fancy Gun Handling
 Hat manipulation
 Hocker, as in Stool tricking or Sporthocker
 Hoops
Chunkey
Fire hooping
 Hoop (rhythmic gymnastics)
 Hoop busker
Hoop rolling
Hula hoop
Native American Hoop Dance
 Rings (men's rhythmic gymnastics)
 Jacob's ladder (toy)
 Rubik's Magic
 Jump ropes
 Chinese jump rope
 Rope (rhythmic gymnastics)
 Skip-It (Lemon Twist or Footsie)
 Skipping rope
 Jwibulnori (perhaps also called Rat Fire), fire can spinning
 Keepie Uppie, and various related forms:
 Balloon (game)
 Basse
 Battledore and shuttlecock (or Jeu de volant)
 Beach ball
 Bossaball
 Chinlone
 Cuju
 Footbag
 Footvolley
 Hand sack
 Hanetsuki
 Jianzi
 Jegichagi
 Kai (a cooperative game from the Torres Strait)
 Kamifūsen
 Kemari
 Matkot
 Mesoamerican ball game (Pok-ta-pok), Ulama (game), and Batey (game)
 Peteca
 Picigin
 Sepak takraw
 Sipa
  Tossing the Ball (Cree volleyball game)
 Volleyball manipulation
 Woggabaliri
 Kite
 Knives and Swords
 Butterfly knife
 Karambit
 Knife throwing
 Urumi
 Knuckle roller
 Knucklebones
 Labyrinth
 Lasso for Trick roping
 Mandala toy (a.k.a. Wire Mandala toy)
 Marble
 Milk caps (Pogs)
 Paddleballs
 Bolo bat
 Paper folding and Papercutting
 Chinese paper cutting
 Chinese paper folding (Zhezhi)
 Flexagon
 Jewish paper cutting
 Kirigami
 Net (polyhedron)
 Origami
 Action origami
 Pabalat
 Papel picado
 Paper plane
Paper snowflake
 Paper yo-yo
 Pen spinning
 Perfection
 Pellet drum (Rattle drum or Damaru)
 Pili, based on the game jianzi 
 Pindaloo
 Pogo stick
 Lolo ball
 Space hopper
 Vurtego
 Projectiles
 Aerobie (Flying ring)
 Chakram
 Baseball (ball) and related forms
 Cricket ball
 Softball
 Wiffle ball
 Football
 Nerf Vortex football
 Spiral foam football
 Foxtail sport (or foxtail toy or foxtail ball)
 Flying gyroscope (flying cylinder)
 Frisbee
 Golf ball
 Glider
 Non-powered airplane gliders (made of balsa wood, foam, paper, or plastic, and hand-thrown, slingshot driven, or wind-up rubber band propeller driven)
 Shuriken
 Throwing stick
 Boomerang
 Valari
 Punching bag and dummy
 Roly-poly toy (e.g. Bobo doll toy)
 Mook jong
 Speed bag
 Puppet
 Hand puppet
Bunraku
Finger puppet
Glove puppet
Human-arm puppet
Rod puppet
Sock puppet
 Jumping jack (toy)
 Marionette
British marionettes
Buz-baz (Afghan marionettes)
Czech marionettes
German marionettes
Russian puppetry
Opera dei Pupi (Sicilian marionettes)
Yoke thé (Burmese marionettes)
 Shadow play
 Water puppetry
 Quoits and related games
 Cup-and-ball and Ring and pin
 Penobscot birch bark triangle and ball game 
 Kendama
 Deck tennis and Tennikoit
 Game of graces
 Game of ring toss 
 Ring toss
 Muckers
 Ringing the bull and Bimini Ring Game
 Waterful ring toss
 RC helicopters, planes, cars, boats, 
 Ribbons
 Ribbon (rhythmic gymnastics)
 Sangmo and Yoldubal 
 Swing Wing (toy)
 Rocking horse
 Spring rider
 Rope dart and Dragon beard hook
 Scoop ball, Jai alai (toy version) which uses a wiffle ball
 Shoot the Moon (tabletop game)
 Simon (game)
 Bop It
 Skateboarding and related forms
 Kick scooter
 Eccentric-hub scooter
 Trikke (Wiggle scooter)
 Roller skates
 Inline skates
 Roller shoe (Heelys)
 Aircoasters
 Sit 'n Spin
 Slinky
 Toroflux (aka Flow ring)
 Speed typing contest
 Speedcubing
 Stacking and Unstacking, or Adding and Removing games
 Barrel of Monkeys
 Blockhead!
 Buckaroo!
 Domino toppling
 Don't Break the Ice
 House of cards (Card stacking)
 Jenga
 Wire loop game 
 Operation (game)
 Pick-up Sticks
 Bierki
 Jack straws
 Jonchets
 Mikado (game)
 Pick-up sticks (Haida)
 Speed stacking
 Staff (various staffs of various lengths from various martial arts)
 Arnis stick twirling (aka Escrima or Kali, stick is held at one end and not in the middle as in baton twirling)
 Fei cha (Flying fork trident)
 Stick discipline (men's rhythmic gymnastics) 
 Three-section staff
 Tonfa
 Two section staff
 Sticky hand toy
Stilts
 Coconut-shell walking
 Jumping stilts
Stone skipping
Waboba
 Strategy games requiring some physical skill, coordination, and dexterity
 Air hockey
 Klask
 Badminton
 Board (such as a bullseye), and other often fixed targets
Aunt Sally
Coconut shy
Axe throwing
Cornhole
Darts and spears
Balloon and Dart
Khuru
Lawn darts
Disc golf
Dunk tank
Horseshoes
Knife throwing
Ladder toss
Penny in the hole (Pitch Penny)
Toad in the hole
Igel jokoa (frog game)
Quarters (game)
Washer pitching
Pitch-pot (Touhu)
Tejo
Varpa
Digor
 Bowling
Alley bowling
Ten-pin
Nine-pin
Five-pin
Candlepin bowling
Duckpin bowling
Kegel
Trick bowling
Turkey bowling
 Boules
 Basque bowls
 Bocce
 Boccia
 Bocce volo or Jeu provençal
 Bolas criollas
 Bolo palma
 Bowls (Lawn bowls)
 Feather bowling
 Rolle Bolle
 Pétanque
 Short mat bowls
 Taistelupetankki
 Tejo (Argentina)
Carnival bowling games
Fascination
Horse Race
Skee-Ball
 Button football
 Subbuteo
 Croquet
 Roque
 Woodball
 Cue sports
 Carom billiards (Carambole billiards)
 Artistic billiards
 Balkline
 Cushion caroms (One-cushion billiards or Cushion carom billiards or Indirect game)
 Five-pin billiards (Five-pins or 5-pins)
 Goriziana (Nine-pin billiards or Nine-pins or 9-pins)
 Four-ball billiards (Four-ball carom or Four-ball or 4-ball or Fourball)
 Straight rail (Straight billiards or Three-ball billiards or Free game)
 Three-cushion billiards(Three-cushion carom)
 Pocket billiards
 Bar billiards
 Kaisa (cue sport) (Karoliina)
 Pool (cue sports)
 Bank pool
 Eight-ball (8-ball or Eightball)
 Nine-ball (9-ball)
 One-pocket (One pocket or 1-pocket)
 Straight pool (14.1 continuous or 14.1 rack)
 Ten-ball
 Russian pyramid
 Snooker
 Disk-flicking games
 Carrom
 Chapayev (game)
 Crokinole
 Novuss
 Penny football
 Pichenotte
 Pitchnut
 Electric Football
 Marble (toy)
 Cherokee marbles
 Miniature golf
 Sholf
 Paper football
 Penny football
 Pinball
Pitching pennies
 Skittles
Bunnock
Finnish skittles
Fowling
Gorodki
Kubb
Mölkky
 Table cricket
 Table football (Foosball)
 Tabletop football
 Sports table football
 Table hockey games
 ITHF table hockey
 Table shuffleboard
 Bankboard
 Bonus Shuffle
 Table tennis (Ping pong)
 Curling
 Shuffleboard (Deck shuffleboard)
 Shove ha'penny
 Sjoelen
 Tiddlywinks
 Ants in the Pants
 String climbers
 Friction and slip
 Mountain climber (single string)
 Climbing bear (double string)
 Double pulley or spool 
 Climbing tin monkey
 Tethered ball games (tethered to a pole or anchor)
 Jokari
 Speed-ball
 Tetherball
 Totem tennis (Swingball)
 Tibetan prayer wheel
 Trick shot (billiards)
 Tops and other spinners
 Aeolian top
 Pinwheel (toy)
 Euler's disk
 Gyroscope
 Hurricane balls
 Rattleback
 Tippe top
 Spinning hard-boiled egg (Related examples:  PhiTOP, Tesla's Egg of Columbus)
 Turkish Spinning Top or Turkish Yo-yo
 Torches
 True balance
 Whee-lo
 Magnetic Gyro Wheel
 Radiaculum
 Spiraculum
 Whirligig (Buzzer)
 Op Yop
 Wooden toy acrobat 
 Whipcracking
 Yo-yos
 Punch balloon
 Yo-yo water ball
 Yo Stick
 Zippo
 Zorb
 Water ball

Juggling props

Juggling prop, most often a juggling ball or beanbag, may also refer to:
Aerial hoop
Aerial silk
Chair acrobatics
Cigar box
Contact juggling
Cyr wheel
Flair bartending
Teh tarik (Pulled Tea)
Juggling club
Indian club
 Clubs (rhythmic gymnastics) 
Juggling ring
Bouncing ball
Knife juggling
Logrolling
Risley (circus act)
Rolling globe
Torch
Sign Twirling
ball juggling
Plate spinning
Stilt walking
Wheel gymnastics
Staff/Staves (contact, thrown or spun) 
Poi (2 or 3, contact, thrown or spun) 
Rope Dart
Sword Spinning (contact or traditional)
Kendama (increasingly associated with juggling culture) 
Yo-yo
Diablo (Chinese Yo-yo)
Fire Fans
 Shaker cups

Physical activity and dexterity toys